This is a list of notable restaurants in Germany.

Restaurants in Germany

Munich
Aumeister
Hirschgarten
Tantris

Cologne
Vendôme

Dresden
Ballhaus Watzke

Nuremberg
Bratwurst-Röslein
Bratwursthäusle Nürnberg

Elsewhere
Alte Taverne ― traditional restaurant in Bad Füssing, Bavaria.
Andechs ― monastery restaurant in Andechs Abbey, Bavaria, Germany.
Regensburg Sausage Kitchen ― restaurant in Regensburg, Germany.

Former restaurants
Großgaststätte Ahornblatt ―
Horcher ― Popular restaurant in Nazi Germany. Originally opened in Berlin, Germany, in 1904. Moved to Madrid, Spain in 1943.

See also

 German cuisine
 List of companies of Germany
 Lists of restaurants

References

Companies of Germany
Germany
Restaurants